The Canal de São Vicente is a strait of the Atlantic Ocean separating the islands of Santo Antão and São Vicente, Cape Verde. The ferry route between the ports of Porto Novo on Santo Antão and Mindelo on São Vicente crosses the canal. The channel begins in São Vicente's northwesternmost cape near Monte Cara up to the headland Ponta de João d'Évora in the northeast. 

The Canal de São Vicente is the habitat of some endemic species, including the demosponge Amphilectus strepsichelifer and the cone snail Conus fernandesi.

References

Bodies of water of Cape Verde
Geography of Santo Antão, Cape Verde
Geography of São Vicente, Cape Verde
Straits of the Atlantic Ocean